Roncesvalles can mean:

Roncesvalles, a small village in Navarre, northern Spain
Roncevaux Pass, a mountain pass near this village, called Roncesvalles in Spanish
the Battle of Roncevaux Pass, fought there in 778
the Battle of Roncevaux Pass (824), also fought there
the Battle of Roncesvalles (1813), also fought there
Roncesvalles, an urban neighbourhood and a street (Roncesvalles Avenue) in Toronto, Canada
Roncesvalles, Tolima, a municipality in Colombia